Auchecranon is a monotypic moth genus of the family Noctuidae. Its only species, Auchecranon elegans, is found in Kenya. Both the genus and species were first described by Emilio Berio in 1979.

References

Acronictinae
Monotypic moth genera